Free Union is a census-designated place (CDP) in Albemarle County, Virginia, United States, ten miles north-northwest of Charlottesville. The population as of the 2020 Census was 187. It is a very small hamlet consisting of a private school (Free Union Country School), a doctor's office, a post office, a country store, a homebuilder, and several dozen homes. Otherwise it is entirely rural in character.

History
The area was first settled in the mid-18th century and became a part of Albemarle County in 1761. The village was originally referred to as Nicksville after a free slave blacksmith named Nick, who opened a blacksmith's shop there in the early 19th century. When a post office was established in 1847, it was given the name of Free Union to avoid confusion with Nixville, another post office in the county. The name was taken from that of the Free Union Church, which had been built in 1837 and is still operating as the Free Union Baptist Church. The church was "free" in that all races were welcome to worship there, and it was a "union" of four denominations of Christianity, none of which could have afforded a church of their own at that time. Free Union continued to be known as Nixville until the early 20th century, when the post office's name caught on.

The Ballard-Maupin House was added to the National Register of Historic Places in 1999.

Climate
Climate is characterized by relatively high temperatures and evenly distributed precipitation throughout the year.  The Köppen Climate Classification subtype for this climate is "Cfa" (Humid Subtropical Climate).

See also
Buck Mountain, near Free Union

References

Census-designated places in Albemarle County, Virginia